Ganbat Bolor-Erdene (born 26 March 1995), also commonly known as Bolor-Erdene Ganbat, is a Mongolian parataekwondo practitioner. He will compete at the 2020 Summer Paralympics in the 61 kg category, having qualified via World Ranking.

References

External links
 

1995 births
Living people
Mongolian male taekwondo practitioners
Taekwondo practitioners at the 2020 Summer Paralympics
21st-century Mongolian people